Charles Warren Bradley II (born April 9, 1970) is a former American football offensive tackle who played one season with the Cincinnati Bengals of the National Football League (NFL). He was drafted by the Houston Oilers in the sixth round of the 1993 NFL Draft. He played college football at the University of Kentucky and attended Fern Creek High School in Fern Creek, Louisville. Bradley was also a member of the Barcelona Dragons, Memphis Mad Dogs, Toronto Argonauts and BC Lions.

References

External links
Just Sports Stats

Living people
1970 births
Players of American football from Louisville, Kentucky
Players of Canadian football from Louisville, Kentucky
American football offensive tackles
Canadian football offensive linemen
American players of Canadian football
Kentucky Wildcats football players
Cincinnati Bengals players
Barcelona Dragons players
Memphis Mad Dogs players
Toronto Argonauts players
BC Lions players
Sportspeople from Covington, Kentucky
Fern Creek High School alumni